The American Psychological Association (APA) is the largest scientific and professional organization of psychologists in the United States, with over 146,000 members, including scientists, educators, clinicians, consultants, and students. It has 54 divisions—interest groups for different subspecialties of psychology or topical areas. The APA has an annual budget of around $125 million.

Profile
The APA has task forces that issue policy statements on various matters of social importance, including abortion, human rights, the welfare of detainees, human trafficking, the rights of the mentally ill, IQ testing, sexual orientation change efforts, and gender equality.

Governance
APA is a corporation chartered in the District of Columbia. APA's bylaws describe structural components that serve as a system of checks and balances to ensure democratic process. The organizational entities include:
 APA President. The APA's president is elected by the membership. The president chairs the Council of Representatives and the Board of Directors. During his or her term of office, the president performs such duties as are prescribed in the bylaws.
 Board of Directors. The board is composed of six members-at-large, the president-elect, president, past-president, treasurer, recording secretary, CEO, and the chair of the American Psychological Association of Graduate Students (APAGS). The board oversees the association's administrative affairs and presents an annual budget for council approval.
 APA Council of Representatives. The council has sole authority to set policy and make decisions regarding APA's roughly $125 million annual income. It is composed of elected members from state/provincial/territorial psychological associations, APA divisions and the APA Board of Directors.
 APA Committee Structure: Boards and Committees. Members of boards and committees conduct much of APA's work on a volunteer basis. They carry out a wide variety of tasks suggested by their names. Some have responsibility for monitoring major programs, such as the directorates, the journals and international affairs.

Good Governance Project
The Good Governance Project (GGP) was initiated in January 2011 as part of the strategic plan to "[assure] APA's governance practices, processes and structures are optimized and aligned with what is needed to thrive in a rapidly changing and increasingly complex environment." The charge included soliciting feedback and input stakeholders, learning about governance best practices, recommending whether change was required, recommending needed changes based on data, and creating implementation plans. The June 2013 GGP update on the recommended changes can be found in the document "Good Governance Project Recommended Changes to Maximize Organizational Effectiveness of APA Governance". The suggested changes would change APA from a membership-based, representational structure to a corporate structure. These motions were discussed and voted upon by council on July 31, 2013, and August 2, 2013.

Organizational structure
APA comprises an executive office, a publishing operation, offices that address administrative, business, information technology, and operational needs, and five substantive directorates:
the Education Directorate accredits doctoral psychology programs and addresses issues related to psychology education in secondary through graduate education;
the Practice Directorate engages on behalf of practicing psychologists and health care consumers;
the Public Interest Directorate advances psychology as a means of addressing the fundamental problems of human welfare and promoting the equitable and just treatment of all segments of society;
the Public and Member Communications Directorate is responsible for APA's outreach to its members and affiliates and to the general public;
the Science Directorate provides support and voice for psychological scientists.

Membership and title of "psychologist"

APA policy on the use of the title psychologist is contained in the Model Act for State Licensure of Psychologists: psychologists have earned a doctoral degree in psychology and may not use the title "psychologist" and/or deliver psychological services to the public, unless the psychologist is licensed or specifically exempted from licensure under the law. State licensing laws specify state specific requirements for the education and training of psychologists leading to licensure. Psychologists who are exempted from licensure could include researchers, educators, or general applied psychologists who provide services outside the health and mental health field.

Full membership with the APA in United States and Canada requires doctoral training whereas associate membership requires at least two years of postgraduate studies in psychology or approved related discipline. The minimal requirement of a doctoral dissertation related to psychology for full membership can be waived in certain circumstances where there is evidence that significant contribution or performance in the field of psychology has been made.

Affiliate organizations
American Psychological Association Services, Inc. (APASI) was formed in 2018 and is a 501(c)(6) entity, which engages in advocacy on behalf of psychologists from all areas of psychology.

Awards
Each year, the APA recognizes top psychologists with the "Distinguished Contributions" awards; these awards are the highest honors given by the APA.
 APA Award for Distinguished Scientific Contributions to Psychology
 APA Distinguished Scientific Award for the Applications of Psychology 
 Award for Distinguished Contributions to Psychology in the Public Interest
 Award for Distinguished Contributions to Education and Training in Psychology
 APA Award for Distinguished Professional Contributions to Applied Research
 Award for Distinguished Professional Contributions to Independent Practice.
 Award for Distinguished Professional Contributions to Practice in the Public Sector
 APA Award for Distinguished Contributions to the International Advancement of Psychology
 APA Award for Lifetime Contributions to Psychology (APA's highest award)
 APA International Humanitarian Award

Publications

The American Psychologist is the association's official journal. APA also publishes over 70 other journals encompassing most specialty areas in the field; APA's Educational Publishing Foundation (EPF) is an imprint for publishing on behalf of other organizations. Its journals include:

 Archives of Scientific Psychology
 Behavioral Neuroscience
 Developmental Psychology
 Emotion
 Health Psychology
 Journal of Applied Psychology
 Journal of Comparative Psychology
 Journal of Experimental Psychology
 Journal of Experimental Psychology: Applied
 Journal of Family Psychology
 Journal of Occupational Health Psychology
 Journal of Personality and Social Psychology
 Psychological Bulletin
 Psychological Review
 Psychology and Aging
 Psychology of Addictive Behaviors
 Psychology of Violence
 School Psychology Quarterly

The APA has published hundreds of books. Among these books are: the Publication Manual of the American Psychological Association (and a concise version titled Concise Rules of APA Style), which is the official guide to APA style; the APA Dictionary of Psychology; an eight-volume Encyclopedia of Psychology; and many scholarly books on specific subjects such as Varieties of Anomalous Experience. The APA has also published children's books under the Magination Press imprint, software for data analysis, videos demonstrating therapeutic techniques, reports, and brochures.

The Psychologically Healthy Workplace program
The Psychologically Healthy Workplace Program (PHWP) is a collaborative effort between the American Psychological Association and the APA Practice Organization designed to help employers optimize employee well-being and organizational performance. The PHWP includes APA's Psychologically Healthy Workplace Awards, a variety of APA Practice Organization resources, including PHWP Web content, e-newsletter, podcast and blog, and support of local programs currently implemented by 52 state, provincial and territorial psychological associations as a mechanism for driving grassroots change in local business communities. The awards are designed to recognize organizations for their efforts to foster employee health and well-being while enhancing organizational performance. The award program highlights a variety of workplaces, large and small, profit and non-profit, in diverse geographical settings. Applicants are evaluated on their efforts in the following five areas: employee involvement, work-life balance, employee growth and development, health and safety, and employee recognition. Awards are given at the local and national level.

APA style

American Psychological Association (APA) style is a set of rules developed to assist reading comprehension in the social and behavioral sciences. Used to ensure clarity of communication, the layout is designed to "move the idea forward with a minimum of distraction and a maximum of precision." The Publication Manual of the American Psychological Association contains the rules for every aspect of writing, especially in the social sciences from determining authorship to constructing a table to avoiding plagiarism and constructing accurate reference citations. "The General Format of APA is most commonly used to cite sources within the social sciences. General guidelines for a paper in APA style includes: typed, double-spaced on standard-sized paper (8.5" x 11") with 1" margins on all sides. The font should be clear and highly readable. APA recommends using 12 pt. Times New Roman font." The seventh edition of the Publication Manual of the American Psychological Association was published in October 2019.

Databases
APA maintains a number of databases, including PsycINFO, PsycARTICLES, PsycBOOKS, PsycEXTRA, PsycCRITIQUES, PsycTESTS, and PsycTHERAPY. APA also operates a comprehensive search platform, PsycNET, covering multiple databases.

PsycINFO is a bibliographic database that contains citations and summaries dating from the 19th century, including journal articles, book chapters, books, technical reports, and dissertations within the field of psychology. , PsycINFO has collected information from 2,457 journals.

History

Founding
The APA was founded in July 1892 at Clark University by a small group of around 30 men; by 1916 there were over 300 members. The first president was G. Stanley Hall. During World War II, the APA merged with other psychological organizations, resulting in a new divisional structure. Nineteen divisions were approved in 1944; the divisions with the most members were the clinical and personnel (now counseling) divisions. From 1960 to 2007, the number of divisions expanded to 54. Today the APA is affiliated with 60 state, territorial, and Canadian provincial associations.

Dominance of clinical psychology
Due to the dominance of clinical psychology in APA, several research-focused groups have broken away from the organization. These include the Psychonomic Society in 1959 (with a primarily cognitive orientation), and the Association for Psychological Science (which changed its name from the American Psychological Society in early 2006) in 1988 (with a broad focus on the science and research of psychology). Theodore H. Blau was the first clinician in independent practice to be elected president of the American Psychological Association in 1977.

Presidents

Notable people
 

Bart Rossi, psychologist and author

Divisions
The APA has 56 numbered divisions, 54 of which are currently active:

 Society for General Psychology – the first division formed by the APA, in 1945, concerned with issues across the subdisciplines of psychology
 Society for the Teaching of Psychology – provides free teaching material for students and teachers of psychology and bestows many awards
 Society for Experimental Psychology and Cognitive Science
 Currently vacant – initially reserved for the Psychometric Society, which decided against becoming an APA division after the establishment of the similarly defined Division 5 
 Quantitative and Qualitative Methods – previously named Evaluation, Measurement, and Statistics
 Behavioral Neuroscience and Comparative Psychology
 Developmental Psychology
 Society for Personality and Social Psychology
 Society for the Psychological Study of Social Issues (SPSSI)
 Society for the Psychology of Aesthetics, Creativity and the Arts
 Currently vacant – initially Abnormal Psychology and Psychotherapy, which joined Division 12 in 1946 
 Society of Clinical Psychology – established in 1945 with 482 members. Became the Division of Clinical and Abnormal Psychology in  1946, and took it's current name in 1998. In 1962 it created clinical child psychology as its first section.
 Society of Consulting Psychology - originally Division of Counseling and Guidance Psychologists
 Society for Industrial and Organizational Psychology
 Educational Psychology
 School Psychology – originally formed as the Division of School Psychologists in 1945, renamed in 1969
 Society of Counseling Psychology
 Psychologists in Public Service
 Society for Military Psychology
 Adult Development and Aging
 Applied Experimental and Engineering Psychology
 Rehabilitation Psychology
 Society for Consumer Psychology
 Society for Theoretical and Philosophical Psychology
 Behavior Analysis
 Society for the History of Psychology
 Society for Community Research and Action: Division of Community Psychology
 Psychopharmacology and Substance Abuse
 Psychotherapy
 Society of Psychological Hypnosis
 State, Provincial and Territorial Psychological Association Affairs
 Society for Humanistic Psychology
 Intellectual and Developmental Disabilities / Autism Spectrum Disorder
 Society for Environmental, Population and Conservation Psychology
 Society for the Psychology of Women
 Society for the Psychology of Religion and Spirituality
 Society for Child and Family Policy and Practice
 Society for Health Psychology
 Psychoanalysis
 Society for Clinical Neuropsychology
 American Psychology-Law Society
 Psychologists in Independent Practice
 Society for Family Psychology
 Society for the Psychology of Sexual Orientation and Gender Diversity
 Society for the Psychological Study of Ethnic Minority Issues
 Media Psychology
 Exercise and Sport Psychology
 Society for the Study of Peace, Conflict, and Violence: Peace Psychology Division
 Society of Group Psychology and Group Psychotherapy
 Society of Addiction Psychology
 Society for the Psychological Study of Men and Masculinities
 International Psychology
 Society of Clinical Child & Adolescent Psychology
 Society of Pediatric Psychology
 Society for Prescribing Psychology
 Trauma Psychology – addresses issues of trauma with projects, working groups and via collaborations

Positions on sexual orientation

Cause of sexual orientation

The APA states the following:

In 1975, APA issued a supporting statement that homosexuality is not a mental disorder.

Conversion therapy

Conversion therapy (also referred to as reparative therapy) is the practice of attempting to change the patient’s sexual orientation to heterosexual.  Among the most prominent supporters of conversion therapy is the National Association for Research & Therapy of Homosexuality (NARTH), which continues to characterize homosexuality as a mental disorder, despite the declassification of homosexuality as a disorder in the Diagnostic and Statistical Manual of Mental Disorders (DSM) in 1973. One of the most notable members of NARTH is founder and former president Dr. Joseph Nicolosi, who practiced conversion therapy and has published case studies of some of his clients.

The American Psychological Association (APA) task force report on appropriate therapeutic responses to sexual orientation concluded that conversion therapy was "unlikely to be successful" and involved "some risk of harm".  Likewise, the U.S. Surgeon General issued a call to action in 2001, concluding that "there is no valid scientific evidence that sexual orientation can be changed".

In the task force's report, the APA recommends that therapists adopt an affirmative, supportive approach for clients who present for therapy to change their sexual orientation rather than attempting to convert their sexual orientation.

There is a concern in the mental health community that the advancement of conversion therapy itself causes social harm by disseminating inaccurate views about sexual orientation and the ability of homosexual and bisexual people to lead happy, healthy lives. Most mainstream health organizations are critical of conversion therapy, and no mainstream medical organization endorses conversion therapy.

The APA adopted a resolution in August 2009 stating that mental health professionals should avoid telling clients that they can change their sexual orientation through therapy or other treatments. The approval, by APA's governing Council of Representatives, came at APA's annual convention, during which a task force presented a report that in part examined the efficacy of so-called "reparative therapy", or sexual orientation change efforts.

The "Resolution on Appropriate Affirmative Responses to Sexual Orientation Distress and Change Efforts" also advises that parents, guardians, young people, and their families avoid sexual orientation treatments that portray homosexuality as a mental illness or developmental disorder and instead seek psychotherapy, social support, and educational services "that provide accurate information on sexual orientation and sexuality, increase family and school support, and reduce rejection of sexual minority youth."

Same-sex marriage 

The APA adopted a resolution stating that it is unfair and discriminatory to deny same-sex couples legal access to civil marriage and to all its attendant rights, benefits, and privileges. It also filed an amicus brief in the federal court case in which Judge Vaughn Walker struck down California's constitutional ban on same-sex marriage. The APA later praised the decision and denied the existence of any "scientific justification" for a ban on same-sex marriage.

In August 2011, the APA clarified their support of same-sex marriage in light of continued research suggesting that the same community benefits accepted as result of heterosexual marriage apply to same-sex couples as well. Dr. Clinton Anderson, then associate executive director of the APA and director of the Office on Lesbian, Gay, Bisexual and Transgender Concerns, said that, prior to this research, "We knew that marriage benefits heterosexual people in very significant ways, but we didn't know if that would be true for same-sex couples." Anderson also put forward the APA's view that merely allowing same-sex civil unions is an inadequate option: "Anything other than marriage is, in essence, a stigmatization of same-sex couples. Stigma does have negative impacts on people."

APA internship crisis for graduate students
The APA is the main accrediting body for U.S. clinical and counseling psychology doctoral training programs and internship sites. APA-accredited clinical psychology PhD and PsyD programs typically require students to complete a one-year full-time clinical internship in order to graduate (or a two-year part-time internship). However, there is currently an "internship crisis" as defined by the American Psychological Association, in that approximately 25% of clinical psychology doctoral students do not match for internship each year. This crisis has led many students (approximately 1,000 each year) to re-apply for internship, thus delaying graduation, or to complete an unaccredited internship, and often has many emotional and financial consequences. Students who do not complete an APA-accredited internship in the U.S. are barred from certain employment settings, including VA hospitals, the military, and cannot get licensed in some states, such as Utah and Mississippi. Additionally, some postdoctoral fellowships and other employment settings require or prefer an APA-accredited internship. The APA has been criticized for not addressing this crisis adequately and many psychologists and graduate students have petitioned for the APA to take action by regulating graduate training programs.

Warfare and the use of torture 
A year after the establishment of the Human Resources Research Organization by the U.S. military in 1951, the CIA began funding numerous psychologists (and other scientists) in the development of psychological warfare methods under the supervision of APA treasurer Meredith Crawford. Donald O. Hebb, the APA president in 1960 who was awarded the APA Distinguished Scientific Contribution Award in 1961, defended the torture of research subjects, arguing that what was being studied was other nations' methods of brainwashing. Former APA president Martin Seligman spoke upon the invitation of the CIA on his animal experimentation where he shocked a dog unpredictably and repeatedly into total, helpless passivity. Former APA president Ronald F. Levant, upon visiting Guantanamo Bay, affirmed that psychologists were present during the torture of prisoners, arguing that their presence was to "add value and safeguards" to interrogations. Former APA president Gerald Koocher argued, referring to allegations of continuing systemic abuse by psychologists, that such allegations were originating from "opportunistic commentators masquerading as scholars."

During the Iraq War, Amnesty International released a series of reports, calling attention to violations of the human rights of prisoners in Abu Ghraib Prison and American detention camps, and the role of the United States and the United Kingdom in enacting these abuses.  The reports called on the occupying powers to protect the human rights of any detained civilians by giving them a fair and timely trial, not detaining civilians arbitrarily, and treating all people ethically while in detention. Amnesty International also called for justice, by trying individual perpetrators of abuse for their crimes.

Despite these reports, the Bush administration instituted "enhanced" interrogation techniques, stating publicly that reported abuses were isolated incidents, and not standard practice. Internal memos from the Federal Bureau of Investigation revealed that an executive order by George W. Bush had sanctioned certain interrogation techniques, such as playing loud music, depriving prisoners of sleep, and stripping prisoners of their clothing.

The CIA reportedly required involvement from health professionals to continue its practice of "enhanced" interrogations on detainees, to maintain the lawfulness of their practices. Psychiatrists and medical doctors were reluctant to participate in interrogations, however some psychologists participated.  A report by a group of psychologists alleges the same, implicating a number of APA officials as well.

When it emerged that psychologists, as part of the Behavioral Science Consultation Team, were advising interrogators in Guantánamo and other U.S. facilities on improving the effectiveness of the "enhanced interrogation techniques", the APA called on the U.S. government to prohibit the use of unethical interrogation techniques and labeled specific techniques as torture. Critics pointed out that the APA declined to advise its members not to participate in such interrogations. In September 2008, the APA's members passed a resolution stating that psychologists may not work in settings where "persons are held outside, or in violation of, either international law (e.g., the UN Convention Against Torture and the Geneva Conventions) or the U.S. Constitution (where appropriate), unless they are working directly for the persons being detained or for an independent third party working to protect human rights." The resolution became official APA policy in February 2009. However, the APA has refused to sanction those members known to have participated in and, in some cases, designed abusive interrogation techniques used in Guantanamo Bay, Iraq, and Afghanistan interrogation centers.

The APA directive was in contrast to the American Psychiatric Association ban in May 2006 of all direct participation in interrogations by psychiatrists, and the American Medical Association ban in June 2006 of the direct participation in interrogations by physicians. An independent panel of medical, military, ethics, education, public health, and legal professionals issued a comprehensive report in November 2013 that "charged that U.S. military and intelligence agencies directed doctors and psychologists working in U.S. military detention centers to violate standard ethical principles and medical standards to avoid infliction of harm." One group of psychologists in particular, the Coalition for an Ethical Psychology, has been very harsh in its criticism of the APA stance on its refusal to categorically prohibit members from participating in any phase of military interrogations. They recently stated their continuing disagreement with APA leadership in an open letter posted on their website on October 31, 2012, in which they reiterated their condemnation of torture and enhanced interrogation techniques, and called for the APA to require its members to refuse participation in military conducted interrogations of any kind.

After the abuses were made public, the APA created a task force called Psychological Ethics and National Security (PENS) and released a report stating that the APA Code of Ethics applies to psychologists working in any setting, and that psychologists do not facilitate or participate in any degrading or cruel behavior, referring back to the APA's 1986 Resolution Against Torture. The report also called on psychologists to report any suspected or observed inhumane treatment to the appropriate authorities and obey federal law.

Amending the Ethics Code
In February 2010, the APA's Council of Representatives voted to amend the association's Ethics Code to make clear that its standards can never be interpreted to justify or defend violating human rights. There is a history of similar issues with the  Canadian Psychological Association. Following are the two relevant ethical standards from the APA Ethics Code, with the newly adopted language shown in bold:

In its 2013 "Policy Related to Psychologists' Work in National Security Settings and Reaffirmation of the APA Position Against Torture and Other Cruel, Inhuman, or Degrading Treatment or Punishment, the APA condemns the use of any of the following practices by military interrogators trying to elicit anti-terrorism information from detainees, on the ground that "there are no exceptional circumstances whatsoever, whether induced by a state of war or threat of war, internal political instability or any other public emergency, that may be invoked as a justification."

Hoffman report
In November 2014, the APA ordered an independent review into whether it cooperated with the government's use of torture of prisoners during the George W. Bush administration, naming Chicago attorney David H. Hoffman to conduct the review. On July 2, 2015, a 542-page report was issued to the special committee of the board of directors of the APA relating to ethics guidelines, national security interrogations, and torture. The report concluded that the APA secretly collaborated with the Bush administration to bolster a legal and ethical justification for the torture of prisoners. Furthermore, the report stated that the association's ethics director Stephen Behnke and others had "colluded with important Department of Defense officials to have the APA issue loose, high-level ethical guidelines that did not constrain" the interrogation of terrorism suspects at Guantanamo Bay. The association's "principal motive in doing so was to align APA and curry favor with DOD." An APA official said that ethics director Stephen Behnke had been "removed from his position as a result of the report" and indicated that other firings or sanctions might follow.

Ultimately, the findings of the Hoffman Report revealed that the APA had an unfair bias towards prisoners due to the organization's relationship with the federal government. This resulted in a tidal wave of consequences for the APA. On July 14, 2015, the APA announced the retirement of its CEO, Norman B. Anderson, effective the end of 2015, and of Deputy Chief Executive Officer Michael Honaker, effective August 15, 2015, and the resignation of Rhea K. Farberman, APA's executive director for public and member communication. Anderson had been CEO since 2003.

Ban on involvement
For at least a decade, dissident psychologists within and outside the APA, including the group WithholdAPAdues, had protested the involvement of psychologists "in interrogations at CIA black sites and Guantánamo." Prior to the release of the Hoffman report, which undermined the APA's repeated denials and showed that some APA leaders were complicit in torture, the dissidents were ignored or ridiculed.

On August 7, 2015, just weeks following the release of the Hoffman report, the APA council of representatives met at the association's 123rd annual convention in Toronto, Ontario. At that meeting, the APA council passed Resolution 23B, which implemented the 2008 membership vote to remove psychologists from settings that operate outside international law, and banning the participation of psychologists in unlawful interrogations. With 156 votes in favor and only one vote against, the resolution passed with the near unanimous approval of council members. The adoption of Resolution 23B aligned the APA's policy with that of the American Psychiatric Association and that of the American Medical Association by prohibiting psychologists from participating in interrogations deemed illegal by the Geneva Conventions and the United Nations Convention against Torture. The ban will not "prohibit psychologists from working with the police or prisons in criminal law enforcement interrogations".

Class action lawsuit by members claiming deceptive dues assessments
In 2013 a class action lawsuit was brought against APA on behalf of approximately 60,000 of its 122,000 members who were licensed clinicians. Those members paid an additional $140 practice assessment fee as part of their membership dues every year beginning in 2001 to fund the lobbying arm of APA, the APA Practice Organization (APAPO). The lawsuit accused APA of using deceptive means by representing that the assessment was mandatory for APA membership even though payment of the assessment was only required for membership in the APAPO. In 2015 APA settled the case by establishing a $9.02 million settlement fund to be used to pay claims made by members of APA who paid the practice assessment, as well as attorneys' fees and certain other costs. APA agreed to change its policies to make clear that the APAPO membership dues are not required for membership in APA.

Animal research

Currently, the APA enforces ethical standards to protect nonhuman animal subjects from unnecessary harm during the research process. Some of the requirements for using nonhuman animals in research include: proper justification of the research, maintenance and inspection of appropriate housing for the animals, minimizing discomfort and stress whenever possible, and preference of noninvasive measures.

Despite these guidelines, however, many advocacy groups exist to either reduce or eliminate animal research, arguing that it is unethical to capture animals and subject them to research procedures.

Evidence-based practice
A current controversy among mental health professionals involves the use of the terms evidence based practice or evidence based treatment. Proponents of the evidence-based treatments movement argue that it is unethical to administer a therapeutic intervention with questionable research support when another treatment's effectiveness has been demonstrated for the client's condition, particularly when the intervention in question is potentially harmful (such as conversion therapy). Proponents argue that administration of an empirically questionable treatment violates the general Principle A of the ethical principles of psychologist: Beneficence and nonmaleficence (or "do no harm").

Critics of the evidence-based practice movement note ethical concerns regarding the research and practice of evidenced-based treatments themselves. Despite the demonstrated effectiveness of a range of treatments, including psychoanalytic and psychodynamic therapies, evidence-based practice is a term now associated only with short-term, manualized treatments which have been evaluated in randomized control trials. Among the problems associated with an exclusive focus on randomized control trials to determine treatment effectiveness is that the relevance of these trials (conducted on highly selected patient populations) is unclear for psychologists working with real-world patients. Furthermore, while the public may assume evidence-based is synonymous for "likely to help", research studies indicate that most patients do not show meaningful improvement in so-called evidence-based treatments.

See also
 American Board of Professional Psychology
 American Psychoanalytic Association
 Association of Black Psychologists
 Association of Psychological and Social Studies
 Canadian Psychological Association
 European Federation of Psychologists' Associations
 National Association of School Psychologists
 Peace psychology
 Society of Clinical Child & Adolescent Psychology

Notes

References

External links
 
 
 Psychologists for Social Responsibility

 
Organizations established in 1892
School accreditors
Academic publishing companies
1892 establishments in Massachusetts